Lieutenant General Harry Hammon Lyster VC, CB (24 December 1830 – 1 February 1922) was an Irish recipient of the Victoria Cross, the highest and most prestigious award for gallantry in the face of the enemy that can be awarded to British and Commonwealth forces.

Details
He was 27 years old and a lieutenant in the 72nd Bengal Native Infantry, Bengal Army, during the Indian Mutiny when the following deed took place, for which he was awarded the VC.  The citation read:

Other despatches from Hugh Henry Rose describes how on 31 January 1858 at Barodia, when Lyster had been acting as Rose's interpreter, Lyster was wounded when fighting a nephew of Mahomed Fazil Khan, receiving a "deep sword cut on [the] inner part of [his] right forearm."  He killed Khan's nephew during the fight.

Further information
In 1847-48 he served as a special constable in London during the Chartist riots. He took a commission in the British East India Company's army on 20 September 1848 and was promoted major on 19 January 1864, brevet lieutenant colonel on 26 March 1870, and brevet colonel on 25 November 1877. He was Mentioned in Despatches while in command of 3rd Goorkha Regiment at the Battle of Ahmed Khel during the Second Anglo-Afghan War, and appointed Companion of the Order of the Bath on 22 February 1881. He was promoted lieutenant general on 1 September 1891, and retired from the army on 1 July 1892.

Harry Hammon Lyster is mentioned disparagingly by Flashman in Flashman in the Great Game by George MacDonald Fraser.

His VC is on display in the Lord Ashcroft Gallery at the Imperial War Museum, London.

Family
He married twice: to Caroline Matilda Davis in 1865; and, following her death in 1895, to Ada Emily Cole in 1901.  He died in London on 1 February 1922.

He was the son of Anthony Lyster (1797-1880) of Stillorgan Park, County Dublin, and Marcia, the sixth daughter of James Tate of Ballintaggart House, Colbinstown, County Kildare. Marcia Tate's mother Maria Stratford was a daughter of John Stratford, 3rd Earl of Aldborough. See also: Lister (surname).

References

Listed in order of publication year 
Denny, Revd HLL. A History of the Family of Lister or Lyster. Ballantyne Hanson & Co., Edinburgh (1913)
The Register of the Victoria Cross (1981, 1988 and 1997)

Ireland's VCs  (Dept of Economic Development, 1995)
Monuments to Courage (David Harvey, 1999)
Irish Winners of the Victoria Cross (Richard Doherty & David Truesdale, 2000)

External links
Location of grave and VC medal (Berkshire)

1830 births
1922 deaths
19th-century Irish people
Irish soldiers in the British East India Company Army
Irish soldiers in the British Indian Army
Irish expatriates in India
Irish expatriates in the United Kingdom
People from Blackrock, Dublin
Irish recipients of the Victoria Cross
British Indian Army generals
British East India Company Army officers
Companions of the Order of the Bath
Indian Rebellion of 1857 recipients of the Victoria Cross
British military personnel of the Second Anglo-Afghan War
Bengal Staff Corps officers
Military personnel from Dublin (city)